Protein-glutamine gamma-glutamyltransferase K is a transglutaminase enzyme that in humans is encoded by the TGM1 gene.

Function 

Keratinocyte transglutaminase enzymes serve to specifically catalyze the development of the cornified cell envelope, a defining characteristic of epidermal keratinocytes that have undergone the termination of differentiation. The specific cross linkages formed by keratinocyte transglutaminase are between n^ε-(γ-glutamyl)lysine residues which develop into isopeptide protein-protein linkages that adds to the stabilization of the cornified cell envelope.

In terminally differentiated stratified squamous epithelia, the cornified cell envelope protein linkages allow for a structurally fortified, yet flexible (15 nm thick) layer to the place of the cell membrane, acting as a highly insoluble barrier. The expression of the enzyme is most highly exhibited along the biological membrane of these fully formed epithelial cells, preventing the cell from undergoing chemical and or physical damages. A lesser amount of enzymatic activity, of the TGK genes (5-10%), lies within the cytoplasmic fraction of such cells, allowing for finalization of the cross-linkaging necessary for the full functionality of the cornified cell envelope.

Pathology
A deficiency is associated with ichthyosis lamellaris. Epidermal transglutaminase is the autoantigen, in humans, of dermatitis herpetiformis.

A study on the mutation of keratinocyte transglutaminase (TGK)  came to conclude that those affected with ichthyosis lamellaris, present a substantial deficit in keratinocyte transglutaminase activity. It was concluded that those afflicted, display a decrease in activity of the enzyme, as a result of a lessened amount of transcription of the human TGK gene. This lack of protein stems from a common mutation of the TGK gene, which exists in two possible variants, found at the TGM1 locus on the 14q11 chromosome, as  exhibited amongst all the subjects of the study. Such mutations were of the compound heterozygous or homozygous variety, which leads to the expression of lamellar ichthyosis as a result of abnormal cross-linkaging of the cornified cell envelope.

See also 
 Keratinocyte

References

Further reading

External links 
 

Autoantigens